Jonah 1 is the first chapter of the Book of Jonah in the Hebrew Bible or the Old Testament of the Christian Bible. This book contains the prophecies attributed to the prophet Jonah, and is a part of the Book of the Twelve Minor Prophets.

Text 
The original text was written in Hebrew language. This chapter is divided into 17 verses in Christian Bible, but 16 verses in Hebrew Bible with the following verse numbering comparison:

This article generally follows the common numbering in Christian English Bible versions, with notes to the numbering in Hebrew Bible versions.

Textual versions

Some early manuscripts containing the text of this chapter in Hebrew are of the Masoretic Text tradition, which includes the Codex Cairensis (895), the Petersburg Codex of the Prophets (916), and Codex Leningradensis (1008). Fragments cumulatively containing all verses of this chapter in Hebrew were found among the Dead Sea Scrolls, including 4Q76 (4QXIIa; 150–125 BCE) with extant verses 1–5, 7–10, 15–17 (1:17 = 2:1 in Hebrew Bible); 4Q81 (4QXIIf; 175–50 BCE) with extant verses 6–8, 10–16; 4Q82 (4QXIIg; 25 BCE) with extant verses 1–9; and Wadi Murabba'at Minor Prophets (Mur88; MurXIIProph; 75–100 CE) with extant verses 1–17 (1:1–16, 2:1 in Hebrew Bible).

There is also a translation into Koine Greek known as the Septuagint, made in the last few centuries BCE. Extant ancient manuscripts of the Septuagint version include Codex Vaticanus (B; B; 4th century), Codex Sinaiticus (S; BHK: S; 4th century), Codex Alexandrinus (A; A; 5th century) and Codex Marchalianus (Q; Q; 6th century). Fragments containing parts of this chapter in Greek were found among the Dead Sea Scrolls, that is, Naḥal Ḥever 8Ḥev1 (8ḤevXIIgr); late 1st century BCE) with extant verses 14–17.

Verse 1
 Now the word of the Lord came unto Jonah the son of Amittai, saying,

 "Now" (or "and"): a "common formulary" to link together revelations and histories, and often used in the Old Testament at the beginning of independent works; e.g. ; ; ; ; Ezekiel 1:1.
 "Jonah the son of Amittai": Jonah signifies "Dove"; Amittai means "the truth of God," "truth," "truth-telling." The Syriac version has "the son of Mathai", or "Matthew", whereas Arab versions have a notion that Mathai is his mother's name (observing that none are called after their mothers except Jonas and Jesus Christ), but the right name is "Amittai", and signifies "my truth". This prophet's name is also recorded in  along with his hometown, Gath-hepher in Zebulun (called Gittah-hepher in ), a part of the Kingdom of Samaria, not the Kingdom of Judah. He prophesied the restoration of the coast of Israel from "the entering of Hamath unto the sea of the plain" to the Kingdom of Israel which was fulfilled during the reign of Jeroboam the son of Joash. As this prophecy was given at a time when Israel was at the lowest point of depression, when "there was not any shut up or left," that is, none to act as a helper for Israel, it cannot have been given in Jeroboam's reign, which was marked by prosperity, for in it Syria was worser in fulfillment of the prophecy, and Israel raised to its former "greatness." It must have been, therefore, in the early part of the reign of Joash, Jeroboam's father, who had found Israel in subjection to Syria, but had raised it by victories which were followed up so successfully by Jeroboam. Thus Jonah was the earliest of the prophets, and close to Elisha, who died in Joash's reign, and just before his death gave a token prophetical of the thrice defeat of Syria.

Verse 2
 "Arise, go to Nineveh, that great city, and cry out against it; for their wickedness has come up before Me."

Verse 3

 But Jonah rose up to flee unto Tarshish from the presence of the Lord, 
 and went down to Joppa; and he found a ship going to Tarshish:
 so he paid the fare thereof, and went down into it,
 to go with them unto Tarshish from the presence of the Lord.
 "Tarshish"—Tartessus in Spain; in the farthest west at the greatest distance from Nineveh in the east.
 "From the presence of the Lord" - literally "from being before the Lord." Jonah knew well, that man could not escape from the presence of God, whom he knew as the Self-existing One, He who alone is, the Maker of heaven, earth and sea. He did not "flee" then "from His presence," knowing well what David said Psalm 139:7, Psalm 139:9-10. Jonah fled, not from God's presence, but from standing before him, as His servant and minister. He refused God's service, because, as he himself tells God afterward Jonah 4:2, he knew what it would end in, and he misliked it.
 "Joppa". This is the modern Jaffa (or "Haifa"; called "Japho" in Joshua 19:46), a town on the seacoast, the well-known port of Palestine on the Mediterranean. It was 50 miles from Gath-hepher; thirty miles in a northwesterly direction from Jerusalem.

Verse 17
  Now the Lord had prepared a great fish to swallow up Jonah.
 And Jonah was in the belly of the fish three days and three nights.
 Verse numbering: Masoretic text includes this verse in Jonah 2 as Jonah 2:1.
 Cited in Matthew 12, Matthew 16, Luke 11
 "Had prepared": (Septuagint: προσέταξε, "appointed"; so in Jonah 4:6, 7, 8 (cf.) implying that God didn't create it at that time but just ordered it to swallow Jonah at the appointed time. From some expressions in his psalm (Jonah 2:5), Jonah seemed to have sunk to the bottom of the sea before he was swallowed by the fish.
 "A great fish": ,   Septuagint, κῆτος. There is nothing in the word to identify the type of the animal, and calling it "a whale" is a mistranslation. See explanation in a separate section.

Great fish
There are records of men swallowed by large fish and lived. A booklet by Grace W. Kellogg, "The Bible Today," contains a list of authenticated records of living things inside fish being rescued alive. Others also speculate and propose a number of possibilities.
 The Mediterranean white shark, Carcharias vulgaris, sometimes measures 15 feet long, has been known to "swallow a man whole, and even a horse".  There are also reports that the shark swallowed a reindeer without its horns, or a whole sea cow, about the size of an ox. Keith Robinson and Donna Parham of SeaWorld speculate that the Mediterranean great white shark could swallow a person whole; they stated that elephant seals (some bigger than a killer whale) are one of the favorite meals of the great white shark and also told of seeing a photograph "of a great white shark opening its mouth, and it had within its gullet a whole six-foot blue shark, ...so it could easily swallow a man." With the metabolism of a shark and in a cold water, a human body could last three days without deterioration.
 Two deep sea creatures could easily have swallowed Jonah: the sulphur-bottom whale, Balaenoptera musculus, and the whale shark, Rhinodon typicus. Without any teeth, these two fish feed by opening their giant mouths, submerging the lower jaw, rushing through the water at great speed and after straining out the water, they swallow whatever is left. A 100-foot sulphur-bottom whale was captured off Cape Cod in 1933, with a mouth of 10 or 12 feet wide. The stomach of these whales has 4 to 6 compartments and the head of this whale can form an air storage chamber, an enlargement of the nasal sinus, often measuring 7 feet high, 7 feet wide, and 14 feet long. 
 In 2011, Mauricio Handler photographed a diver who almost got sucked into the mouth of a massive whale shark during a feeding frenzy where more than 600 of the 40 ft so-called "shark suckers" gathered to feed on tuna spawn. The mouth of a whale shark (Rhincodon typus) can be up to 1.5 m wide, containing up to 350 rows of teeth. This type of shark, the sea's largest fish, is actually incredibly docile, so despite their size, do not pose a risk to divers. The largest recorded specimen, was 12.65 m (41.5 ft) long, weighed more than 21.5 tons and had a girth of 7 meter, caught off the coast of Pakistan in 1947. In a museum at Beirut, Syria, there is a whale shark head big enough to swallow a man.
 Sperm whales have been reported to swallow squid whole. In 2009, a photograph was taken showing a female sperm whale, with a calf at her side, carrying the remains of a roughly 30-foot (9-meter) giant squid in her jaws, while swimming near the surface off Japan's Bonin Islands (map)in the northwestern Pacific. There is a story of a sailor being swallowed by a sperm whale off the Falkland Islands in the early 1900s.
 Dr. Ransome Harvey  (quoted in the Cleveland Plain Dealer) reported that a dog was lost overboard from a ship and six days later was found in the head of a whale, alive and barking.
 Frank Bullen, F.R.G.S., who wrote, 'The Cruise of the Cachalot,' reported a 15-foot shark found in the stomach of a whale, which ejected the contents of its stomach when dying.

See also

Related Bible parts: , Matthew 12, Matthew 16, Luke 11

Notes

References

Sources

External links

Jewish
Jonah 1 Hebrew with Parallel English
Jonah 1 Hebrew with Rashi's Commentary

Christian
Jonah 1 English Translation with Parallel Latin Vulgate

01